The Norma Fleck Award for Canadian Children’s Non-Fiction is a lucrative literary award founded in May 1999 by the Fleck Family Foundation and the Canadian Children's Book Centre, and presented to the year's best non-fiction book for a youth audience.  Each year's winner receives CDN$10,000.

The award is one of several presented by the Canadian Children's Book Centre each year; others include the Marilyn Baillie Picture Book Award, the Geoffrey Bilson Award for Historical Fiction for Young People and the TD Canadian Children's Literature Award.

Awards and winners

1999
Andy Turnbull and Debora Pearson, By Truck to the North: My Winter Adventure
Gena K. Gorrell, Catching Fire: The Story of Firefighting
Barbara Greenwood, The Last Safehouse: A Story of the Underground Railroad
Larry Verstraete, Accidental Discoveries: From Laughing Gas to Dynamite
Mary Wallace, The Inuksuk Book

2000
Simon Tookoome and Sheldon Oberman, The Shaman's Nephew: A Life in the Far North
Sarah Ellis, The Young Writer's Companion
Linda Maybarduk, The Dancer Who Flew: A Memoir of Rudolf Nureyev
Irene Morck, Five Pennies: A Prairie Boy's Story

2001
Gena K. Gorrell, Heart and Soul: The Story of Florence Nightingale
Linda Granfield, Pier 21: Gateway of Hope
Ann Love and Jane Drake, The Kids Book of the Far North
Ronald Orenstein, New Animal Discoveries
Candace Savage, Born to be a Cowgirl: A Spirited Ride Through the Old West

2002
Jack Batten, The Man Who Ran Faster Than Everyone: The Story of Tom Longboat
Karen Levine, Hana's Suitcase
Susan Musgrave, Nerves Out Loud: Critical Moments in the Lives of Seven Teen Girls
Jane Pavanel, The Sex Book: an alphabet of smarter love
John Wilson, Righting Wrongs: The Story of Norman Bethune

2003
Larry Loyie with Constance Brissenden, As Long as the Rivers Flow
Kathy Conlan, Under the Ice
Chan Hon Goh with Cary Fagan, Beyond the Dance: A Ballerina's Life
Candace Savage, Wizards: An Amazing Journey through the Last Great Age of Magic
Roderick Stewart, Wilfrid Laurier: A Pledge for Canada

2004
Val Ross, The Road to There: Mapmakers and Their Stories
Nicolas Debon, Four Pictures by Emily Carr
Anne Dublin, Bobbie Rosenfeld: The Olympian Who Could Do Everything
Reva Marin, Oscar: The Life and Music of Oscar Peterson
John Wilson, Discovering the Arctic: The Story of John Rae

2005
Shari Graydon, In Your Face: The Culture of Beauty and You
Hazel Hutchins, A Second Is a Hiccup
Marthe Jocelyn, A Home for Foundlings
Kathy Kacer, The Underground Reporters
Ange Zhang, Red Land, Yellow River: A Story from the Cultural Revolution

2006
Bill Slavin and Jim Slavin, Transformed: How Everyday Things Are Mad
Deborah Ellis, Our Stories, Our Songs: African Children Talk About AIDS
Nadja Halilbegovich, My Childhood Under Fire: A Sarajevo Diary
Susan Hughes, Coming to Canada: Building a Life in a New Land
Kathy Kacer, Hiding Edith: A True Story

2007
Jan Thornhill, I Found a Dead Bird: The Kids’ Guide to the Cycle of Life & Death

2008
Hugh Brewster, At Vimy Ridge: Canada's Greatest World War I Victory

2009
Mariatu Kamara with Susan McClelland, The Bite of the Mango

2010
Priscilla Galloway with Dawn Hunter, Adventures on the Ancient Silk Road
 Charis Cotter, Born to Write: The Remarkable Lives of Six Famous Authors
 Scot Ritchie, Follow That Map! A First Book of Mapping Skills
 William Gilkerson, A Thousand Years of Pirates
 Kathy Kacer and Sharon E. McKay. Whispers from the Ghettos

2011
Susan Hughes, Case Closed? Nine Mysteries Unlocked by Modern Science
 Daniel Loxton, Evolution: How We and All Living Things Came to Be
 Elin Kelsey, Not Your Typical Book About the Environment
 Jody Nyasha Warner, Viola Desmond Won't Be Budged
 Hadley Dyer, Watch This Space: Designing, Defending and Sharing Public Spaces

2012
Susan Vande Griek, Loon
 Rafal Gerszak with Dawn Hunter, Beyond Bullets: A Photo Journal of Afghanistan
 Dora Lee, Biomimicry: Inventions Inspired by Nature. Illustrated by Margot Thompson. Toronto: Kids Can Press, 2011.
 Susan Hughes, Off to Class: Incredible and Unusual Schools Around the World. Toronto: Owlkids Books Inc., 2011.
 Marthe Jocelyn, Scribbling Women: True Tales from Astonishing Lives. Toronto: Tundra Books, 2011.

2013
Deborah Ellis, Kids of Kabul: Living Bravely Through a Never-Ending War
 Monica Kulling, Going Up! Elisha Otis’s Trip to the Top
 Bill Swan, Real Justice: Fourteen and Sentenced to Death – The Story of Steven Truscott
 Deborah Hodge, Rescuing the Children: The Story of the Kindertransport.

2014
Rona Arato, The Last Train: A Holocaust Story
 Ken Setterington, Branded by the Pink Triangle
 Elizabeth Macleod and Frieda Wishinsky, A History of Just About Everything: 180 Events, People and Inventions That Changed the World
 Deborah Ellis, Looks Like Daylight: Voices of Indigenous Kids
 Eric Walters, My Name Is Blessing

2015
Kira Vermond, Why We Live Where We Live
 Hugh Brewster, From Vimy to Victory: Canada’s Fight to the Finish in World War I
 David J. Smith, If: A Mind-Bending New Way of Looking at Big Ideas and Numbers
Larry Loyie with Wayne K. Spear and Constance Brissenden, Residential Schools, With the Words and Images of Survivors: A National History
 Sarah Elton. Starting from Scratch: What You Should Know about Food and Cooking

2016
Cory Silverberg, Sex Is a Funny Word: A Book About Bodies, Feelings, and You
 Edward Keenan, The Art of the Possible: An Everyday Guide to Politics
 Maria Birmingham, A Beginner’s Guide to Immortality: From Alchemy to Avatars
 Jessica Dee Humphreys and Michel Chikwanine, Child Soldier: When Boys and Girls Are Used in War
 Paula Ayer, Foodprints: The Story of What We Eat

2017
Elizabeth MacLeod, Canada Year by Year
 Laura Scandiffio, Fight to Learn: The Struggle to Go to School
 Kristina Rutherford, Level the Playing Field: The Past, Present, a Future of Women’s Pro Sports
 Jan Thornhill, The Tragic Tale of the Great Auk
 Antonia Banyard and Paula Ayer, Water Wow! An Infographic Exploration

2018
Lisa Charleyboy and Mary Beth Leatherdale, #NotYourPrincess: Voices of Native American Women
 Sarah Elton, Meatless? A Fresh Look at What You Eat
 Hetxw’ms Gyetxw (Brett D. Huson), The Sockeye Mother 
 Jane Drake and Ann Love. Rewilding: Giving Nature a Second Chance
 James Gladstone, When Planet Earth Was New

2019
James Gladstone and Karen Reczuch, Turtle Pond. 
 Merrie-Ellen Wilcox, After Life: Ways We Think About Death
 Rob Laidlaw, Bat Citizen: Defending the Ninjas of the Night
 Wab Kinew and Joe Morse, Go Show the World: A Celebration of Indigenous Heroes
 Erica Fyvie snd Bill Slavin, Trash Revolution: Breaking the Waste Cycle

2020 

 Serah-Marie McMahon and Alison Matthews David,  Killer Style: How Fashion Has Injured, Maimed, & Murdered Through History

 Rachel Poliquin, Beastly Puzzles: A Brain-Boggling Animal Guessing Game
 Carolyn Fisher, Cells: An Owner’s Handbook
 Ashley Spires, Fairy Science
 Carey Newman and Kirstie Hudson, Picking Up the Pieces: Residential School Memories and the Making of the Witness Blanket

2021 

 Karen Pheasant-Neganigwane. Powwow: A Celebration Through Song and Dance
 Rina Singh. 111 Trees: How One Village Celebrates the Birth of Every Girl. Illustrated by Marianne Ferrer. 
 Kyla Vanderklugt. Crows: Genius Birds.
 Hetxw’ms Gyetxw (Brett D. Huson). The Eagle Mother. Illustrated by Natasha Donovan. 
 Tanya Lloyd Kyi. This Is Your Brain on Stereotypes: How Science is Tackling Unconscious Bias. Illustrated by Drew Shannon.

2022 

 The Power of Style: How Fashion and Beauty Are Being Used to Reclaim Cultures, written by Christian Allaire and illustrated by Jacqueline Li
 Boy from Buchenwald: The True Story of a Holocaust Survivor, by Robbie Waisman with Susan McClelland 
 The Girl Who Loved Giraffes and Became the World’s First Giraffologist, by Kathy Stinson and by François Thisdale, ill.
 Growing Up Trans: In Our Own Words, by Dr. Lindsay Herriot and Kate Fry, eds.
 Mad for Ads: How Advertising Gets (and Stays) in Our Heads, by Erica Fyvie and Ian Turner, ill.

References

External links
Norma Fleck Award – Canadian Children's Book Centre website

Canadian children's literary awards
Canadian non-fiction literary awards
Awards established in 1999
1999 establishments in Canada